Mountain View is a suburb of Johannesburg, South Africa. It is located in Region E of the City of Johannesburg Metropolitan Municipality.

History
The suburb is situated on part of an old Witwatersrand farm called Klipfontein. It was established in 1902 and was named because of it view of the northern Magaliesberg mountains.

References

Johannesburg Region E